The Hartford Charter Oaks were a professional American football team based in Hartford, Connecticut. They began play in 1964 as a member of the Atlantic Coast Football League, replacing the Ansonia Black Knights. In 1965 the Charter Oaks were one of several ACFL franchises to join the new Continental Football League, where they finished in last place in their division.

Jerry Fishman, notorious for his unsportsmanlike behavior in the 1964 Maryland-Navy game, played his lone full professional season with the Charter Oaks in 1965.

After cancelling a few games in 1967 due to financial difficulty, the Charter Oaks announced they were ceasing operations in March 1968. The team cited losses of approximately $250,000. The Atlantic Coast Football League immediately established the Hartford Knights to replace the Charter Oaks in the market, and by at least one player's account (that of eventual Pro Bowl fullback Marv Hubbard), the Knights were still known as the Charter Oaks for at least their first season. The Knights would play for the next six seasons, winning the ACFL title in 1968, appearing in but losing the title games every year from 1969 to 1971, and winning the Seaboard Football League in 1972.

Season-by-season

References

Atlantic Coast Football League teams
Continental Football League teams
American football teams in Connecticut
Defunct sports teams in Connecticut
Sports in Hartford, Connecticut
American football teams established in 1964
American football teams disestablished in 1968
1964 establishments in Connecticut
1968 disestablishments in Connecticut